Bolshoy Palnik (Ydžyt Paľnik) is a rural locality (a village) in Bolshekochinskoye Rural Settlement, Kochyovsky District, Perm Krai, Russia. The population was 37 as of 2010. There is 1 street.

Geography 
Bolshoy Palnik is located 13 km northeast of Kochyovo (the district's administrative centre) by road. Vezhayka is the nearest rural locality.

References 

Rural localities in Kochyovsky District